Séverine Foulon (born 8 December 1973, in Lille) is a former French athlete, who specialized in the middle distances. She has 21 caps for France Athletics - 8 youth and 13 international.

Career  
Foulon won the French national  800 meters title during the 1995 French Championships at Charléty Stadium in Paris. In 1991, she won the bronze medal in the European Junior Championships in Thessaloniki (Greece). She won the bronze medal Mediterranean Games, in Bari, Italy. In 1990, she set a French record in the 800m for junior's running with 2:05.00 in Dole. She set another French record in the 1500m for junior's indoor running with 4:28.03 in Liévin in 1992.

Prize list  
 French Championships in Athletics   :  
 winner of the 800m 1995   
 France Cross Country Champion d'Aix les Bains in 1990 (Cadette)

Records

Notes and references  
 Docathlé2003, Fédération française d'athlétisme, 2003, p. 404

1973 births
Living people
French female middle-distance runners
Sportspeople from Lille
Mediterranean Games bronze medalists for France
Mediterranean Games medalists in athletics
Athletes (track and field) at the 1997 Mediterranean Games
20th-century French women